Dianbu is a town under the administration of Laixi City in eastern Shandong province, China, located about  southwest of downtown Laixi. , it has 66 villages under its administration.

See also 
 List of township-level divisions of Shandong

References 

Township-level divisions of Shandong
Towns in China
Geography of Qingdao